Festival Internacional de Quadrinhos (FIQ) is a comic convention held in Belo Horizonte, Brazil, every two years.

History 

In 1997, the third edition of Bienal Internacional de Quadrinhos (International Comics Biennial) was held in Belo Horizonte. This was an annual comic event held previously in Rio de Janeiro in 1991 and 1993 (the 1995 edition didn't happen because it lost the financial support of the Rio de Janeiro City Hall, which made the event change to Belo Horizonte). With the definitive cancellation of Bienal after the 1997 edition, the Festival Internacional de Quadrinhos (International Comics Festival) was created in 1999, with the same proposal of the previous event that was to present exhibitions of comic artists from all over the world and give the opportunity for independent Brazilian authors to present their works.

The first edition of FIQ was organized by the Belo Horizonte City Hall and had exhibitions, debates, conferences and a comic book fair. The event took place mainly in the Cultural Center of UFMG, besides having exhibitions in libraries over the city. France was the first honored country, counting on special exhibitions, including one in honor of the artist François Boucq. The guest of honor of this edition was the cartoonist Angeli. From then on, the event maintained the biennial periodicity. By 2011, in addition to the guest of honor, there was also a country honored. As of the 2013 edition, the event didn't have honored countries, having instead exhibitions and guests from many different countries. In every edition, a Brazilian artist is chosen as a guest of honor, with exhibitions about his work. This guest, generally, is also responsible for the illustration of the event's poster. In 2017, the event was not held due to lack of money from the city of Belo Horizonte. The edition of that year was transferred to the first semester of 2018, happening to be realized biennial in the even years from then on.

Awards 

The Festival Internacional de Quadrinhos won Troféu HQ Mix, the main Brazilian comic award, in the "Best Event" category in 2004, 2006, 2008, 2010, 2012 and 2014. Some of the exhibitions held at FIQ were also awarded in the "Best Exhibition" category: "Angeli, o matador" (2000), "Mozart Couto" (2004), "Batman 70 Anos" (2010), "Criando Quadrinhos - da ideia à página impressa" (2012) e "Ícones dos Quadrinhos" (2014).

The festival also received, in 2012, the Jayme Cortez Trophy, destined to reward great contributions to Brazilian comics.

Locations and dates

References

External links
 

Comics conventions
Prêmio Angelo Agostini winners